Cho Sung-hoon (born 21 April 1998) is a South Korean footballer currently playing as a goalkeeper for Pohang Steelers.

Career statistics

Club

Notes

References

1998 births
Living people
Soongsil University alumni
South Korean footballers
Association football goalkeepers
K League 1 players
Pohang Steelers players